Yosep Anggi Noen (born 15 March 1983) is an Indonesian film director, producer, screenwriter, editor, and actor. With his 2019 film The Science of Fictions, Noen won the Maya Award for Best Director and earned a Citra Award for Best Director nomination.

Early life 
Noen's interest in filmmaking dated back from when he was in high school as he made his first film with a handheld camera. He then joined the local film collective Limaenam Films in Yogyakarta and was actively involved in the Jojga-NETPAC Asian Film Festival.

Career 

After years of working in the industry, Noen released his feature film directorial debut Peculiar Vacation and Other Illnesses in 2012. A road film set in a remote village and mountainous areas, the film was funded by the Swiss Agency for Development and Cooperation and the Hubert Bals Fund. His next feature release, the 2016 biopic of disappeared poet and activist Widji Thukul titled Solo, Solitude, earned Noen critical praise, with The Jakarta Post calling the film "made by people who know what they are trying to say and the message they want to convey." Noen received two Citra Award nominations for Best Director and Best Original Screenplay for his works on the film.

In 2019, Noen directed, wrote, produced, and edited The Science of Fictions. The film saw him reunite with veteran stage actor Gunawan Maryanto who played Widji Thukul in Solo, Solitude. The film garnered Noen four nominations at the 40th Citra Awards for Best Picture, Best Director, Best Original Screenplay, and Best Editing. He lost in the Original Screenplay category to Adriyanto Dewo's Homecoming and the remaining three to Joko Anwar's Impetigore.

His upcoming project, 24 Hours with Gaspar, is an adaptation of Sabda Armandio's novel of the same name starring Citra Award winners Reza Rahadian, Laura Basuki, and Dewi Irawan.

Filmography

Short films

Awards and nominations

References

External links 
 
 

Living people
1983 births
Indonesian film directors
Indonesian screenwriters
Indonesian film producers
Maya Award winners